William J. Frere was an American farmer and politician, serving as a state senator in Maryland. A member of the Democratic Party, Frere represented Charles County, Maryland from 1910 to 1914. Frere lived in Tompkinsville and was a farmer. He was a sponsor of the failed Digges Amendment, which was intended to disenfranchise African-American voters by challenging the Fifteenth Amendment's applicability to state elections, and also to enforce a property requirement. It was strongly defeated in a public referendum.

References

20th-century American farmers
Anti-black racism in Maryland
Democratic Party Maryland state senators
People from Charles County, Maryland